Giorgino is a 1994 French thriller film directed by Laurent Boutonnat.

Plot
In the 1918 war-stricken Giorgio Volli returns to the orphanage where he had been working with children for a while. When arriving he finds out that the tragedy had happened in the house – the wife of the orphanage owner had committed suicide. He couldn't manage to save her. Soon after, it was revealed that the house is almost empty and abandoned, and the children died under unclear circumstances, only one girl named Catherine survived. Giorgio starts to investigate what had happened. Through mysteries and hidden truth, he finds out that the orphanage owner, Doctor Degrace, could be involved in psychiatric experiments with children, which might lead to a tragedy. His daughter – Catherine – is autistic, but she is the only witness of life and death of children; thus, she became a key person for Giorgio to unriddle mysteries of Dr. Degrace.

Cast
 Jeff Dahlgren : Giorgio Volli
 Mylène Farmer : Catherine Degrâce
 Jean-Pierre Aumont : Sébastien Degrâce, Catherine's father
 Joss Ackland : The priest Glaise
 Louise Fletcher : The innkeeper
 Frances Barber : Marie
 Albert Dupontel : Orderly, the crippled nurse
 Christopher Thompson, Christian Gazio : The young captain
 Su Elliot : Marthe
 Janine Duvitski : Josette
 Richard Claxton : Raoul
 John Abineri : Dr. Jodel
 Anne Lambton : Mother Raoul
 Valérie Kaplanová : The old woman
 Lillian Malkina: Mrs.Vennepeyn
 Jana Andresíková: Mme Forestier

Soundtrack
 Soundtrack (released on December 3, 2007) 
 Edition Super Jewel Box
 "Ouverture" (3:52)
 "Le Vent et la Neige" (1:14)
 "La Route de Chanteloup" (1:05)
 "L'Orphelinat"
 "Les Montagnes noires" (2:11)
 "En calèche" (2:19)
 "À Catherine" (1:26)
 "Giorgino theme" (3:37)
 "Levée du corps" (0:46)
 "L'Abbé Glaise" (1:45)
 "Giorgio et les Enfants" (3:09)
 "La Nursery" (3:09)
 "Retour à l'orphelinat" (2:30)
 "L'Armistice" (1:42)
 "La Valse des baisers"
 "Giorgio et Catherine" (3:49)
 "Docteur Degrâce" (4:31)
 "Morts pour la France" (2:28)
 "Les Femmes dans l'église" (1:41)
 "Les Funérailles" (2:37)
 "Petit Georges" (1:21)
 "Sombres Souvenirs" (2:34)
 "Le Christ et les Cierges" (1:41)
 "Menteur" (3:30)
 "Le Marais" (1:50)
 "Final" (7:43)

References

External links 
 

1994 drama films
1994 films
English-language French films
1990s English-language films
1990s French films